A romantic thriller is a narrative that involves elements of the romance and thriller genres. A good thriller provides entertainment by making viewers uncomfortable with moments of suspense, the heightened feeling of anxiety and fright. A thriller is more a familiar concept and description than a pure genre. It is not a genre with a precise definition. It can vary from comedy and melodrama to adventure and romance. All thrillers are a combination of different genres. The basic thriller trait of suspense fits with some genres better than with others. For example, crime, sci-fi and romance allow more scope for suspense than screwball comedies or musicals do.

Romantic thriller is a genre that merges two or more genres together. It is different from established and historically specific cinema movements like Gothic horror or Golden Age detective. (thrillers pp. 260 261)  A genre works on two levels. First a specific theme exists, then general relationships, patterns and structural elements are interwoven to the specific theme. This is why there can be a large variety of visual styles and story structures in romantic thriller.

History

Northrop Frye's Anatomy of Criticism (1957): suggested four archetypal categories in literature; comedy, romance, tragedy and irony or satire. In a romance, the protagonist is only slightly superior to others and can behave in remarkable ways, in a world where ‘ordinary laws of nature are slightly suspended'.

The common element in a romantic plot is adventure. There is an adventure or quest where the hero faces ordeals or monsters. There is often a sense of two worlds, the mundane reality and the unknown mysterious. The concept of a maze is seen in romantic thrillers, where the exit or solution is not easily navigated.  It is similar to a metaphor for a journey with blind spots and false turns where some things are hidden.

In the 1935 release of The Thirty-Nine Steps, character Richard Hannay leaves a theatre with a mysterious and attractive woman, they begin a romantic adventure into a world of spies, double agents, and espionage.  Author John Buchan was a pioneer of spy thrillers, adding romance and adventure traditions into the then-new context of political conflict. The possibility of romance between the mysterious woman, and a decent gentleman was only a minor consideration to Alfred Hitchcock’s adaptation.

Based on Raymond Chandler’s first Detective Marlowe novel, The Big Sleep (1946, with Humphrey Bogart, Lauren Bacall and Martha Vickers): demonstrates the two romantic thriller elements of adventure and dual worlds. The main protagonists are brought together in an attempt to save Bacall’s younger sister Vickers. The main adventure sleuth plot has the characters traveling both together and separately. In a common theme, they are from different social worlds, and wouldn’t usually mix. The romance between the two seems hopeless. Parallel to the adventure story unfolding, the romance travels its own labyrinth of truth and deception, to finally overcome issues of mistrust. The story can be summarised as a private detective working for a rich family, investigates a complex case including murder and blackmail while possibly falling in love. Raymond Chandlers’ Marlowe character was described as ‘a knight in dark armor rescuing a lady.’ Film adaptations of the novels varied according to the directors and producers and their interpretation of the character, using certain traits more than others to tell their story. In a similar way, there is a variety of styles in the adaptations of the James Bond character. Where Marlowe romanced with quick banter with sexual overtones, Bond seduces in a more physical style.

Films 

Opinions vary on what films are in this category; this is only a sampling. The first list is Hollywood movies while the second is broader and includes international films.
 Casablanca (1942): World War II drama of complications and love; stars Humphrey Bogart, Ingrid Bergman and Claude Rains.
 The Maltese Falcon (1941): Detective story with a love affair; stars Humphrey Bogart, Mary Astor and Peter Lorre.

 The Big Sleep (1946): Detective Marlowe story with a love affair; stars Humphrey Bogart, Lauren Bacall, John Ridgely, Martha Vickers.
 Vertigo (1958): Classic Alfred Hitchcock direction. Investigation and romance; stars James Stewart and Kim Novak.
 Charade (1963): Divorcee gets involved in a caper with multiple layers of masked identity; stars Cary Grant, Audrey Hepburn, Walter Matthau, and James Coburn.
 Sleeping With The Enemy (1991): Abused wife fakes her death to escape violent husband; stars Julia Roberts and Patrick Bergin.
 True Romance (1993): By Quentin Tarantino. Full of drugs, drama and sex; stars Christian Slater, Val Kilmer and Patricia Arquette.
 Unfaithful (2002): Marriage to an unfaithful wife has fatal consequences; stars Richard Gere and Diane Lane.
 Mr. and Mrs. Smith (2005): Married couple are secret assassins; stars Angelina Jolie and Brad Pitt.
 The Tourist (2010): Spies rope an unsuspecting tourist into their global hunt for a thief; stars Angelina Jolie, Johnny Depp, Paul Bettany, and Timothy Dalton.

Broader list of examples:
 Pudhiya Paravai (1964)
 The Tamarind Seed (1974)
 Eyes of Laura Mars (1978)
 Diva (1981)
 Breathless (1983)
 Romancing the Stone (1984)
 The Handmaid's Tale (1990)
 Darr (1993)
 Dil Se.. (1998)
 Wicker Park (2004)
 Baober in Love (2004)
 Match Point (2005)
 Gangster: A Love Story (2006)
 Fanaa (2006)
 Birdemic: Shock and Terror (2008)
 The Adjustment Bureau (2011)
 Super 8 (2011)
 Muppozhudhum Un Karpanaigal (2012 Tamil film)
 Nidra (2012 Malayalam film)
 Safe Haven (2013)
 Maha Maha (2015 Tamil film)
 Road Games (2015)
 Gentleman (2016)

References 

Film genres
Romance films
 
Thriller films